The discography of American rock musician Billy Squier, which consists of nine studio albums, two live albums, seven compilation albums, and 24 singles.

Albums

Studio albums

Compilation albums
 A Rock and Roll Christmas (various artists compilation) (1994)
 16 Strokes: The Best of Billy Squier (1995)
 Reach for the Sky: The Anthology (1996) (PolyGram)
 Classic Masters (2002)
 Absolute Hits (2005)
 Essential Billy Squier (2011)
 Icon (2013)

Live albums
 King Biscuit Flower Hour Presents Billy Squier (1996)
 Live in the Dark (DVD)

Singles

References

Rock music discographies